This is a list of notable Muslim comparative theologians, Muslim scholars or preachers engaged in Islamic comparative religion studies.

Imam Ahmad Raza Khan Barelvi
Ahmed Deedat

Zakir Naik
Hafiz Muhammad Shariq
Abu Rayhān al-Bīrūnī
Abdullahi Aliyu Sumaila
Fakhr al-Din al-Razi
Ibn Hazm
Abu al-Hasan al-Ash'ari
Rahmatullah Kairanawi
Ismail al-Faruqi
Yasir Qadhi 
Shabir Ally
Muhammad Taqi Usmani
Abul A'la Maududi
Jamal Badawi
Amir Hussain Editor of the Journal of the American Academy of Religion
Hamza Tzortzis
Hamza Yusuf
Ali Dawah

See also 
List of Islamic jurists

References 

Comparative religionists
Muslim comparative religionists
Religious studies scholars
 Comparative
Comparative religion